The prempensua is a large lamellophone used in the music of Ghana, similar to the marímbula or rumba box. The word prempensua is in the Akan language, although similar instruments are played by other ethnolinguistic groups in Ghana. It is also known as the ‘’kono’’ by the Kassena people, ‘’animgbo’’ by the Dagomba people, and the ‘’gyilgo’’ by the Gonja people.

References

Listening
Prempensua audio sample

Ghanaian musical instruments
Comb lamellophones